Pig War may refer to the following conflicts:

 Saukrieg ("Pig War") 1555–58 feud between the Bishop of Meissen and the family of his predecessor
 Pig War (1859), a largely bloodless border confrontation between the United States and the British Colony of Vancouver Island
 Pig War (1906–1908), a trade war between the Austria-Hungarian Empire and the Kingdom of Serbia
 The Pig War (poem), a Latin poem
 "The Pig War," an episode of Hey, Arnold! loosely inspired by the American-British war on Vancouver Island

See also
 War pig